Eva Pfaff (born 10 February 1961) is a German former professional tennis player.

Career
During her career, she won one singles title and nine doubles titles on the WTA Tour. Her peak world rankings in the sport were 17th in singles (in 1983) and 16th in doubles (1988).

At the 1983 Canadian Open, Pfaff held match points against Martina Navratilova in the round of 16, but lost 6–7 in the third set. She was the only player to have match points against Navratilova that year outside of Martina's loss at the French Open to Kathy Horvath.

Major finals

Grand Slam tournaments

Women's doubles: 1 runner–up

Year-end championships

Doubles: 1 runner–up

WTA Tour career finals

Singles: 3 (1 title, 2 runner-ups)

Doubles: 19 (9 titles, 10 runner-ups)

ITF finals

Doubles (6–1)

Grand Slam singles tournament timeline

References

External links
 
 
 
 
 

1961 births
Living people
German female tennis players
West German female tennis players
People from Hochtaunuskreis
Sportspeople from Darmstadt (region)
Tennis people from Hesse